Cheverells is a Grade II* listed dower house to the Beechwood Park estate in Hertfordshire, England. It dates from around 1693.

References 

Grade II* listed buildings in Hertfordshire
Houses in Hertfordshire
Country houses in Hertfordshire
Dower houses
Buildings and structures completed in 1693
Flamstead